James Beaumont Strachey (26 September 1887, London25 April 1967, High Wycombe) was a British psychoanalyst, and, with his wife Alix, a translator of Sigmund Freud into English. He is perhaps best known as the general editor of The Standard Edition of the Complete Psychological Works of Sigmund Freud, "the international authority".

Early life

He was a son of Lt-Gen Sir Richard Strachey and Lady (Jane) Strachey, called the enfant miracle as his father was 70 and his mother 47. Some of his nieces and nephews, who were considerably older than James, called him Jembeau or Uncle Baby. His parents had thirteen children, of whom ten lived to adulthood.  

He was educated at Hillbrow preparatory school in Rugby and at Trinity College, Cambridge, where he took over the rooms used by his older brother Lytton Strachey, and was known as "the Little Strachey"; Lytton was now "the Great Strachey". At Cambridge, Strachey fell deeply in love with the poet Rupert Brooke, who did not return his affections. He was himself pursued by mountaineer George Mallory, by Harry Norton and by economist John Maynard Keynes, with whom he also had an affair. His love of Brooke was a constant, however, until the latter's death in 1915, which left Strachey "shattered".

On the imposition of military conscription in 1916, during World War I, Strachey became a conscientious objector.

Strachey was assistant editor of The Spectator, and a member of the Bloomsbury Group or "Bloomsberries" when he became familiar with Alix Sargant Florence, though they first met in 1910. They moved in together in 1919 and married in 1920. 

Soon afterwards they moved to Vienna, where Strachey began a psychoanalysis with Freud, of whom he was a great admirer. He would claim to Lytton that his analysis "provided 'a complete undercurrent for life'". Freud asked the couple to translate some of his works into English, and this became their lives' work: they became “my excellent English translators, Mr and Mrs James Strachey”.

The psychoanalytic turn

Looking back forty years later at this turning-point, Strachey commented in a 'disarming passage' to his fellow analysts on his then qualifications as a psychoanalytic candidate, as compared to modern times: 'A discreditable academic career with the barest of B. A. degrees, no medical qualifications...no experience of anything except third-rate journalism. The only thing in my favour was that at the age of thirty I wrote a letter out of the blue to Freud, asking him if he would take me on as a student'.

He continued by saying that, having spent a couple of years in Vienna, “I got back to London in the summer of 1922, and in October, without any further ado, I was elected an associate member of the [Psycho-Analytical] Society. ... A year later, I was made a full member. So there I was, launched on the treatment of patients, with no experience, with no supervision, with nothing to help me but some two years of analysis with Freud".

He concluded wryly that the modern "curriculum vitae is essential. Whether it is possible for it to become over-institutionalized is an open question. Is it worthwhile to leave a loophole for an occasional maverick? ... if the curriculum vitae had existed forty years ago, you wouldn't have had to listen to these remarks tonight".

Nevertheless, Freud had decided that "the Stracheys should become members (full) of the Society. ... To be sure their conflicts have not been decided, but we need not wait so long, we can only instigate the processus which has to be fed by the factors of life". James and Alix thus both become practising analysts; James subsequently began publishing his own original articles; and the two of them (in collaboration with Jones and Joan Riviere) began translating Freud's works in earnest, as well as writings by a number of other European psychoanalysts such as Karl Abraham. Their translation of Freud's works, in twenty-four volumes, remains the standard edition of Freud's works to this day, and according to Michael Holroyd a German publishing house considered retranslating their translation of the Master's works back into German, because they were a work of art and scholarship, with a maze of additional footnotes and introductions.

While the Stracheys were instrumental in encouraging Melanie Klein to come to England to pursue her analytic discoveries, both remained loyal to Freud at the same time, and stood as part of the Middle Group in the wartime Controversial discussions between the proponents of Melanie Klein and of Anna Freud. 'James Strachey characterised the battle between the two women in his own wryly sensible way: "My own view is that Mrs K. has made some highly important contributions ... but that it’s absurd to make out (a) that they cover the whole subject or (b) that their validity is axiomatic. On the other hand, I think it is equally ludicrous for Miss F. to maintain that [Psychoanalysis] is a Game Preserve belonging to the F. family".

Psychoanalytic writings

Strachey published three articles in the International Journal of Psychoanalysis between 1930 and 1935. In the first, on "Some Unconscious Factors in Reading"[1930], he explored the 'oral ambitions...[in] "taking in" words, by hearing or reading, both unconsciously meaning "eating"' – something of central significance 'for reading addictions as well as for neurotic disturbances of reading'.

In his 1931 article on the "Precipitating Factor in the Etiology of the Neuroses", Strachey examined those 'experiences that disturb the equilibrium between warded-of impulses and warding-off forces, an equilibrium hitherto relatively stable'.

His most important contribution, however, was that of 1934 on "The Nature of the Therapeutic Action of Psychoanalysis" – a seminal article arguing that "the fact that the pathogenic conflicts, revived in the transference, are now experienced in their full emotional content makes the transference interpretation so much more effective than any other interpretation". Half a century later, the role of "mutative transference interpretations as described by Strachey (1934)" was still serving as a starting-point for discussion.

His 1962 "Sketch" of Freud's life and work, which serves as an introduction to the Penguin Freud Library, is a genial but wide-ranging survey – grounded in his intimate knowledge of the Freudian corpus, but perhaps with somewhat of the spirit he himself observed in Martin Freud's memoir of his father, Glory Reflected: "this delightful and amusing book serves to redress the balance from more official biographies ... and reveals something of Freud as he was in ordinary life".

The translations

In one of his last letters to Freud, Ernest Jones wrote that 'You probably know you have the reputation of not being the easiest author to translate'. Certainly when translation into English first began, 'the earliest versions were not always felicitous ... casual and at times fearfully inaccurate'. With the coming of the Stracheys, however, 'translations began to improve: in 1924 and 1925, a small English team brought out Freud's Collected Papers, in four volumes' which have been described as 'the most vigorous translations into English' of all time.

Nevertheless, the 24 volume Standard Edition remains Strachey's crowning glory. 'It is a heroic enterprise. Where necessary, it offers variorum texts; it wrestles with intractable material ... and it introduces each work, even the slightest paper, with indispensable bibliographical and historical information'.

The most 'obvious flaw in this translation was the substitution of esoteric neologisms for the plain German terms Freud preferred', so that for example his "I" and his "It" become the Ego and the Id. Lacan took particular exception to "the translation of instinct for Trieb [drive] ... thus basing the whole edition on a complete misunderstanding since Trieb and instinct have nothing in common". Bruno Bettelheim went still further, arguing that "anyone who reads Freud only in Strachey's English translation cannot understand Freud's concern with man's soul".

While accepting that "Strachey's translation was also an act of interpretation and it has not been hard to find spots where he went astray", the fact remains that "Freud was delighted with the work Strachey succeeded in doing"; whilst even into the twenty-first century "the German editions have relied on Strachey's editorial apparatus, which should be a testimony to what he accomplished".

James Strachey, Michael Holroyd, and Lytton Strachey

James is mentioned in the text of Holroyd's biography of Lytton Strachey, and in the introduction to the 1971 Penguin edition and the 1994–95 revised edition. James was the literary executor for his brother Lytton, so Holroyd saw James and Alix frequently over the five years from 1962 that he was researching and writing the first edition (published in 1967–68) of his biography of Lytton. He describes James as "almost an exact replica of Freud himself, though with some traces of Lytton's physiognomy – the slightly bulbous nose in particular. He wore a short white beard because, he told me, of the difficulty of shaving. He had had it now for some fifty years. He also wore spectacles, one lens of which was transparent, the other translucent. It was only later that I learnt he had overcome with extraordinary patience a series of eye operations that had threatened to put an end to his magnum opus". 

James made many objections to Holroyd's initial drafts of the biography, and "Holroyd made the brilliant decision to publish James's acid-sounding comments as footnotes on the pages. ... James's testy objections helped liven up the text".

James was also an authority on Haydn, Mozart and Wagner, and contributed notes and commentaries to Glyndebourne programmes.

See also
 Bloomsbury Group
 Ignacio Matte Blanco

References

Further reading
 Holroyd, Michael: Lytton Strachey: The New Biography. (1994, Chatto & Windus).
The Standard Edition of the Complete Psychological Works of Sigmund Freud, translated from the German under the General Editorship of James Strachey. In collaboration with Anna Freud. Assisted by Alix Strachey and Alan Tyson. 24 volumes. Vintage, 1999.

External links

 Bloomsbury and Psychoanalysis
 
 

1887 births
1967 deaths
English people of Scottish descent
Alumni of Trinity College, Cambridge
British bisexual writers
Bloomsbury Group
English conscientious objectors
British psychoanalysts
English atheists
German–English translators
English LGBT writers
James
Translators of Sigmund Freud
Analysands of Sigmund Freud
Bisexual men